Randolph Friends Meetinghouse is a historic Quaker meeting house in Randolph, Morris County, New Jersey, United States. The land on which the Meeting House stands was purchased by a small group of Quakers in 1758 for a burying ground, i.e. Cemetery The same year a subscription was raised to build a Meeting House on the site for religious and business meeting.

History 
Presumably, English colonists built the Meetinghouse, completing it in 1758.

On October 22 1898, a board of trustees formed the Friends Meeting House and Cemetery Association and bought the site in order to preserve it for future generations.

The site was added to the National Register of Historic Places in 1973.

See also
National Register of Historic Places listings in Morris County, New Jersey

References

Randolph, New Jersey
Quaker meeting houses in New Jersey
Churches on the National Register of Historic Places in New Jersey
Religious buildings and structures completed in 1758
Churches in Morris County, New Jersey
National Register of Historic Places in Morris County, New Jersey
New Jersey Register of Historic Places
18th-century Quaker meeting houses